Latchaw Creek is a  long first-order tributary to Tunungwant Creek.  This is the only stream of this name in the United States.

Variant names
According to the Geographic Names Information System, it has also been known historically as:
Latchaw Run

Course

Watershed

See also 
 List of rivers of New York
 List of rivers of Pennsylvania

References

Rivers of New York (state)
Rivers of Pennsylvania
Tributaries of the Allegheny River
Rivers of Cattaraugus County, New York
Rivers of McKean County, Pennsylvania